Severt Dennolf (13 May 1920 – 8 May 1990) was a Swedish long-distance runner. He competed in the 1948 Summer Olympics in the 10,000 m event and finished fifth.

References

1920 births
1990 deaths
Swedish male long-distance runners
Olympic athletes of Sweden
Athletes (track and field) at the 1948 Summer Olympics